Cybele's Reverie is an EP by English-French rock band Stereolab, released on 19 February 1996 by Duophonic Records. Its title track serves as the lead single from their fourth studio album Emperor Tomato Ketchup. The four-track EP is the only one by Stereolab on which none of the songs are in English: the title track, "Brigitte", and "Young Lungs" are in French, and "Les Yper-Yper Sound" is an instrumental.

The title track was voted number eleven on John Peel's Festive Fifty for 1996.

Composition
"Cybele's Reverie" itself is an early fade of the album version, and "Les Yper-Yper Sound" is a radically different arrangement of the album track "Les Yper-Sound". "Brigitte" pays tribute to Brigitte Fontaine, whom the band would later collaborate with on the single "Caliméro".

Track listing
All tracks by Tim Gane, Laetitia Sadier

 "Cybele's Reverie" – 2:56
 "Les Yper-Yper Sound" – 5:19
 "Brigitte" – 5:45
 "Young Lungs" – 6:36

Personnel 

Mary Hansen – Vocals
Sally Herbert – Strings
Marcus Holdaway – Strings
John McEntire – Synthesizer, Maracas, Tambourine, Producer, Engineer, Vibraphone, Mixing, Electronic Devices
Sean O'Hagan – Organ, Piano (Electric), String Arrangements, Wurlitzer, Vox Organ
Stereolab – Producer, Mixing
Paul Tipler – Producer, Engineer, Mixing
Brad Wood – Saxophone

Charts

References

1996 EPs
Stereolab EPs